The New Caledonian shore skink (Cryptoblepharus  novocaledonicus) is a species of lizard in the family Scincidae. It is endemic to New Caledonia.

References

External Links
 TIGR Reptile Database in Species 2000 and ITIS Catalogue of Life: 2011 Annual Checklist

Cryptoblepharus
Reptiles described in 1928
Taxa named by Robert Mertens